The 2018–19 Sporting CP season was the club's 113th season in existence and 85th consecutive season in the top flight of Portuguese football.

Overview

August
Sporting CP began the domestic season on 12 August 2018 with a 3–1 away win against Moreirense through two goals from Bas Dost and one from Bruno Fernandes. The first Lisbon derby against Benfica was played on 25 August (matchday 3), where a penalty goal from Nani was not enough for a win as the match finished 1–1 at Estádio da Luz.

Players

Transfers

In

Out

Pre-season and friendlies

Competitions

Overview

Primeira Liga

League table

Results summary

Result round by round

Matches

Taça de Portugal

Final

Taça da Liga

Group stage

Knockout phase

UEFA Europa League

Group stage

Round of 32

Statistics

Appearances and goals
Last updated on 18 May 2019

|-
! colspan=14 style=background:#dcdcdc; text-align:center|Goalkeepers

|-
! colspan=14 style=background:#dcdcdc; text-align:center|Defenders

|-
! colspan=14 style=background:#dcdcdc; text-align:center|Midfielders

|-
! colspan=14 style=background:#dcdcdc; text-align:center|Forwards

|-
! colspan=14 style=background:#dcdcdc; text-align:center| Players who have made an appearance or had a squad number this season but have been loaned out or transferred
|-

|-
|}

References

External links

Sporting CP seasons
Sporting
Sporting